The Lakshmi Bai Nagar (station code: LMNR) is one of the local railway stations in Indore City

The railway station of Lakshmi Bai Nagar is located on broad-gauge line. It is connected to Bhopal, Ujjain, Gwalior, Jaipur, Jabalpur, Katni, Khandwa, Ratlam and Bina within the state and almost every other state of India. The Indore Rail Yard is also located Lakshmi Bai Nagar.

Development 
In February 2023, the additional development works for the station commenced to ease the load on Indore Junction and to pave way for its redevelopment as well.

Major Trains
The trains having stoppage at the station are listed as follows:

See also

References 

Railway stations in Indore
Ratlam railway division
Railway junction stations in Madhya Pradesh
Year of establishment missing